The Copa Internacional de Tenis Total Digest was a tennis tournament held in Mexico City, Mexico, in 2013. The event was part of the ATP Challenger Tour and was played on hard courts.

It was intended to be an annual event, but it seems to have been discontinued after only one year.

Past finals

Singles

Doubles

References

External links
Official website

 
ATP Challenger Tour
Tennis tournaments in Mexico
Hard court tennis tournaments
2013 establishments in Mexico
Recurring sporting events established in 2013